is a city in Aichi Prefecture, Japan. , the city had an estimated population of 91,795 in 37,398 households, and a population density of 2,629 persons per km².

Geography

Nisshin is located on the flatlands of central Aichi Prefecture, and is bordered by the metropolis of Nagoya to the west.

Climate
The city has a climate characterized by hot and humid summers and relatively mild winters (Köppen climate classification Cfa).  The average annual temperature in Nisshin is 15.7 °C. The average annual rainfall is 1603 mm with September as the wettest month. The temperatures are highest on average in August, at around 28.0 °C, and lowest in January, at around 4.1 °C.

Demographics
Per Japanese census data, the population of Nisshin has grown rapidly over the past 50 years.

Neighboring municipalities
Aichi Prefecture
Nagoya (Midori-ku, Tenpaku-ku, Meitō-ku)
Toyota
Miyoshi
Nagakute
Tōgō

History

Late modern period
With the establishment of the modern municipalities system on October 1, 1889, the villages of Iwasaki, Shiroyama and Kaguyama were created within Aichi District of Aichi Prefecture.
These three villages merged on May 10, 1906, to create the village of Nisshin.
The village was named after the Imperial Japanese Navy cruiser , which became famous during the Russo-Japanese War.

Contemporary history
Nisshin became a town on January 1, 1951, and was elevated to city status on October 1, 1994.

Government

Nisshin has a mayor-council form of government with a directly elected mayor and a unicameral city legislature of 20 members. The city contributes two members to the Aichi Prefectural Assembly.  In terms of national politics, the city is part of Aichi District 7 of the lower house of the Diet of Japan.

External relations

Twin towns – Sister cities

International
Sister city
Owensboro（Kentucky, United States of America）
since April 4, 2007

National
Kiso（Nagano Prefecture, Chūbu region）
since April 12, 1992
Shima（Mie Prefecture, Kansai region）
since September 26, 2014

Education

University
Aichi Gakuin University – Nisshin campus
Aichi Toho University – Nisshin ground
Nagoya University of Arts and Sciences
Nagoya University of Commerce & Business
Nagoya University of Foreign Studies
Sugiyama Jogakuen University – Nisshin campus
Meijo University – Nisshin campus (Nisshin ground)

Primary and secondary education
Nisshin has nine public elementary schools and four public middle schools operated by the city government and two public high schools operated by the Aichi Prefectural Board of Education. There is also one private high school.

Transportation

Railways

Conventional lines
 Meitetsu
Meitetsu Toyota Line：-  –  –  –

Subways
 Nagoya Municipal Subway
Tsurumai Line： –

Roads

Expressways
 Tōmei Expressway
：- Togo Parking Area –
Nagoya-Seto Expressway

Japan National Route

Local attractions

Tourist attractions
Historic sites
Ruins of Iwasaki Castle
Myousen-ji temple]
Hakusan-gu shrine
Old Ichikawa House

Parks
Aichi Pond
Aichi Ranch
Goshikien

Museums
Maspro Art Museum
Nagoya City Tram & Subway Museum

Notable people from Nisshin 

Michiko Hattori, professional golfer
Akira Ishida, voice actor
Gorō Taniguchi, anime director, writer
Ayaka Suwa, voice actress

External links

References

 
Cities in Aichi Prefecture